Tanzomat is the tenth studio album by German synthpop group And One, released in 2011. The album was released along with a live CD featuring recordings from their ongoing tour.

A single, "Zerstörer", was released prior to the album, but only the two B-sides, "Sex Drive" and "No Song for You" appeared on the album. Some new tracks were played on their current tour, but never made it to the record.

Tanzomat is the band's final release with Out of Line Records. It is also the final album featuring founding member Chris Ruiz as well as Gio van Oli.

Reception

Reception for the album has been mostly positive. Steelberry Clones said "Long-time fans of the band will appreciate the fact that the satire-tinged and versatile mix is very much going back to the roots of the early works of And One."

Track listing

All songs written by Steve Naghavi.

Zerstörer

"Zerstörer" is the first single released to promote the album. Despite being released for this reason, the title track did not appear on the album; the two b-sides, however, were.

A music video was shot for "Sex Drive", one of the b-sides.

References

2011 albums
And One albums